3-Oxetanone, also called oxetan-3-one or 1,3-epoxy-2-propanone, is a chemical compound with formula C3H4O2. It is the 
ketone of oxetane, and an isomer of β-propiolactone.

3-Oxetanone is a liquid at room temperature, that boils at 140 °C.  It is a specialty chemical, used for research in the synthesis of other oxetanes of pharmacological interest.
Oxetan-3-one also has been the object of theoretical studies.

See also
Malonic anhydride or oxetane-2,4-dione
1,2-dioxetanedione

References

Ketones
Oxetanes